The Irish League in season 1963–64 comprised 12 teams, and Glentoran won the championship.

League standings

Results

Top scorers

References
Northern Ireland - List of final tables (RSSSF)

NIFL Premiership seasons
1963–64 in Northern Ireland association football
Northern